Soki N'Zinga (born November 28, 1984 in Luanda) is a retired Angolan professional footballer player.

He played on the professional level in Ligue 2 for Stade Brestois 29.

External links
 
 

1984 births
Living people
Angolan footballers
Angolan expatriate footballers
Association football midfielders
Stade Brestois 29 players
Montluçon Football players
US Concarneau players
Aviron Bayonnais FC players
Stade Plabennécois players
FC Martigues players
C.R. Caála players
Angoulême Charente FC players
AS Vitré players
AS Muret players
Balma SC players
Ligue 2 players
Championnat National players
Championnat National 2 players
Championnat National 3 players
Angolan expatriate sportspeople in France
Expatriate footballers in France